Muhammad Fauzi bin Roslan (born 27 August 1988), commonly known as Kojie is a Malaysian footballer who plays for the Malaysia national team. He plays mainly as a forward or a winger.

Club career

Shahzan Muda, Pahang
He previously played for Shahzan Muda and Pahang before signed with Melaka United for 2017 season. A product of a local talent, he is known for agility, acceleration and strength and being described as "sharp and clever". Combined with his close control and strength to keep the ball, he is described as a menace in the box. On 3 November 2013, he assisted Pahang to defeat Kelantan 0–1 in the Malaysian Cup final which ends Pahang's 21 years drought of the cup.

Melaka United
On 16 November 2016, it was announced that Fauzi has agreed to join Melaka United from Pahang. On 21 February 2017, he made his league debut and scored one goal in a 2–0 win over Kelantan.

International career
In January 2013, Malaysia coach K. Rajagobal has called up Fauzi for opening 2015 AFC Asian Cup qualifier against Qatar on 6 February, after impressive starts to the new Malaysia Super League campaign, who has already netted thrice this season. Malaysia will warm up for the clash with Qatar with a friendly against Iraq on 1 February.

Career statistics

Club

Honours

Club
Pahang
Malaysia Cup (2): 2013, 2014
FA Cup (1): 2014
Malaysian Charity Shield (1): 2014
Piala Emas Raja-Raja (1): 2011

References

External links

1988 births
Living people
Malaysian footballers
Malaysia international footballers
Sri Pahang FC players
Melaka United F.C. players
Shahzan Muda FC players
Sarawak United FC players
People from Pahang
Malaysia Super League players
Association football forwards
Association football wingers
Malaysian people of Malay descent